Adam Chartoi (born 17 March 1997) is a Swedish boxer. He competed in the men's middleweight event at the 2020 Summer Olympics.

References

External links
 

1997 births
Living people
Swedish male boxers
Olympic boxers of Sweden
Boxers at the 2020 Summer Olympics
Place of birth missing (living people)
European Games competitors for Sweden
Boxers at the 2019 European Games
21st-century Swedish people